The Best Fighter ESPY Award was an annual award honoring the achievements of an individual from the world of combat sports. The Best Fighter ESPY Award trophy was presented to the professional or amateur boxer or mixed martial artist adjudged to be the best in a given calendar year at the annual ESPY Awards ceremony in Los Angeles. It was first awarded as part of the ESPY Awards in 2007, subsuming the Best Boxer ESPY Award until 2019, when the Best MMA Fighter ESPY Award was established, and the ESPY Awards began awarding boxers and mixed martial arts fighters separately. Balloting for the award was undertaken by fans over the Internet from between three and five choices selected by the ESPN Select Nominating Committee, which is composed of a panel of experts. It was conferred in July to reflect performance and achievement over the preceding twelve months.

The inaugural winner of the Best Fighter ESPY Award was American welterweight champion Floyd Mayweather Jr., who defeated the incumbent category title holder Oscar De La Hoya two months prior. He is one of two people to have been presented with the award more than once, winning the accolade a total of six times; Mayweather was also nominated in 2015. Filipino boxer Manny Pacquiao has the second most awards won with victories in 2009 and 2011. It has been presented to one woman in its history, American bantamweight mixed martial arts fighter Ronda Rousey in 2015. Between 2007 and 2018, boxers were most successful at the ESPY Awards with nine victories and twenty-four nominations, followed by mixed martial arts with three wins and nineteen nominations.

Winners and nominees

Statistics

See also
 The Ring magazine Fighter of the Year
 Sugar Ray Robinson Award

References

External links
 

ESPY Awards
Boxing awards
Most valuable player awards
Awards established in 2007